Joseph James Wolf (born December 17, 1964) is an American professional basketball coach and former player.

Professional career 
He played in the National Basketball Association (NBA). He was the 13th overall pick of the 1987 NBA Draft, selected by the Los Angeles Clippers. He played college basketball at the University of North Carolina and reached the NCAA tournament all four years under coach Dean Smith. He earned the Carmichael-Cobb Award as UNC's outstanding defensive player and the Jimmie Dempsey Award as UNC's overall statistical leader as a senior in 1987. Lastly, he was elected ACC First Team and ACC All-Tournament Team. He averaged 4.2 points and 3.3 rebounds per game throughout an 11-year professional career. 

In February 2005, a vote was conducted by the Milwaukee Journal Sentinel to select the all-time Wisconsin high school boys basketball team. As a result of this vote, Joe Wolf was named Wisconsin's all-time greatest high school basketball player based on his dominant four-year performance at Kohler High School.

Career statistics

NBA

Regular season

|-
| align="left" | 
| align="left" | L. A. Clippers
| 42 || 26 || 27.1 || .407 || .200 || .833 || 4.5 || 2.3 || 0.9 || 0.4 || 7.6
|-
| align="left" | 1988–89
| align="left" | L. A. Clippers
| 66 || 15 || 22.0 || .423 || .143 || .688 || 4.1 || 1.7 || 0.5 || 0.2 || 5.8
|-
| align="left" | 1989–90
| align="left" | L. A. Clippers
| 77 || 19 || 17.2 || .395 || .200 || .775 || 3.0 || 0.8 || 0.4 || 0.3 || 4.8
|-
| align="left" | 1990–91
| align="left" | Denver
| 74 || 38 || 21.5 || .451 || .133 || .831 || 5.4 || 1.4 || 0.8 || 0.4 || 7.3
|-
| align="left" | 1991–92
| align="left" | Denver
| 67 || 0 || 17.3 || .361 || .091 || .803 || 3.6 || 0.9 || 0.5 || 0.2 || 3.8
|-
| align="left" | 1992–93
| align="left" | Boston
| 2 || 0 || 4.5 || .000 || .000 || .500 || 1.5 || 0.0 || 0.0 || 0.5 || 0.5
|-
| align="left" | 1992–93
| align="left" | Portland
| 21 || 0 || 7.4 || .465 || .000 || .857 || 2.1 || 0.2 || 0.3 || 0.0 || 2.5
|-
| align="left" | 1994–95
| align="left" | Charlotte
| 63 || 6 || 9.3 || .469 || .333 || .750 || 2.0 || 0.6 || 0.1 || 0.1 || 1.4
|-
| align="left" | 1995–96
| align="left" | Charlotte
| 1 || 0 || 18.0 || .000 || .000 || .000 || 2.0 || 0.0 || 2.0 || 0.0 || 0.0
|-
| align="left" | 1995–96
| align="left" | Orlando
| 63 || 8 || 16.6 || .515 || .000 || .724 || 2.9 || 1.0 || 0.2 || 0.1 || 4.6
|-
| align="left" | 1996–97
| align="left" | Milwaukee
| 56 || 7 || 9.4 || .449 || .143 || .737 || 2.0 || 0.4 || 0.3 || 0.2 || 1.7
|-
| align="left" | 1997–98
| align="left" | Denver
| 57 || 8 || 10.9 || .331 || .200 || .500 || 2.2 || 0.5 || 0.4 || 0.1 || 1.5
|-
| align="left" | 1998–99
| align="left" | Charlotte
| 3 || 0 || 4.0 || .000 || .000 || .000 || 0.3 || 0.0 || 0.0 || 0.0 || 0.0
|- class="sortbottom"
| style="text-align:center;" colspan="2"| Career
| 592 || 127 || 16.3 || .423 || .164 || .770 || 3.3 || 1.0 || 0.4 || 0.2 || 4.2
|}

Playoffs

|-
| align="left" | 1992–93
| align="left" | Portland
| 2 || 0 || 10.0 || .500 || .000 || .000 || 2.0 || 0.0 || 0.0 || 0.5 || 1.0
|-
| align="left" | 1994–95
| align="left" | Charlotte
| 1 || 0 || 3.0 || .000 || .000 || .000 || 0.0 || 0.0 || 0.0 || 0.0 || 0.0
|-
| align="left" | 1995–96
| align="left" | Orlando
| 11 || 0 || 7.7 || .348 || .333 || .750 || 0.5 || 0.2 || 0.1 || 0.0 || 1.8
|- class="sortbottom"
| style="text-align:center;" colspan="2"| Career
| 14 || 0 || 7.7 || .360 || .333 || .750 || 0.7 || 0.1 || 0.1 || 0.1 || 1.6
|}

College

|-
| align="left" | 1983–84
| align="left" | North Carolina
| 30 || - || 13.7 || .481 || - || .758 || 2.8 || 0.5 || 0.2 || 0.1 || 3.4
|-
| align="left" | 1984–85
| align="left" | North Carolina
| 30 || - || 30.5 || .566 || - || .781 || 5.3 || 1.9 || 0.6 || 0.5 || 9.1
|-
| align="left" | 1985–86
| align="left" | North Carolina
| 34 || 34 || 25.1 || .532 || - || .712 || 6.6 || 2.1 || 0.5 || 0.3 || 10.0
|-
| align="left" | 1986–87
| align="left" | North Carolina
| 34 || 34 || 29.6 || .571 || .575 || .793 || 7.1 || 2.9 || 1.3 || 0.3 || 15.2
|- class="sortbottom"
| style="text-align:center;" colspan="2"| Career
| 128 || 68 || 24.9 || .551 || .575 || .765 || 5.5 || 1.9 || 0.7 || 0.3 || 9.6
|}

Post-playing career 
Wolf served as head coach of the Idaho Stampede of the CBA and the Colorado 14ers of the NBA Development League. He also worked with the Milwaukee Bucks as an assistant coach to Scott Skiles.  For the 2014–15 season, Wolf was hired by the Brooklyn Nets as an assistant to new head coach Lionel Hollins. In his first season with the team, Wolf and the coaching staff helped lead the Brooklyn Nets to the Eastern Conference Playoffs. After one season as an assistant at UNC Wilmington, he was hired as the head coach of the Greensboro Swarm of the NBA G League, the affiliate of the Charlotte Hornets. On June 30, 2020, the Swarm did not extend Wolf's contract.

References

External links

Career stats @ basketballreference.com
NBA coach file
NBA player bio (archived from 1998)

1964 births
Living people
American expatriate basketball people in Spain
American men's basketball coaches
American men's basketball players
Baloncesto León players
Basketball coaches from Wisconsin
Basketball players from Wisconsin
Boston Celtics players
Brooklyn Nets assistant coaches
Centers (basketball)
Charlotte Hornets players
Colorado 14ers coaches
Denver Nuggets players
Greensboro Swarm coaches
Idaho Stampede (CBA) coaches
Los Angeles Clippers draft picks
Los Angeles Clippers players
McDonald's High School All-Americans
Milwaukee Bucks assistant coaches
Milwaukee Bucks players
North Carolina Tar Heels men's basketball players
Orlando Magic players
Parade High School All-Americans (boys' basketball)
People from Kohler, Wisconsin
Portland Trail Blazers players
Power forwards (basketball)
UNC Wilmington Seahawks men's basketball coaches
William & Mary Tribe men's basketball coaches